Calvary is an outdoor sculpture by Emanuel Max, installed on the north side of the Charles Bridge in Prague, Czech Republic.

Antisemitism
The sculpture features a crucifix surrounded by the Hebrew words קדוש קדוש קדוש יהוה צבאות ("kadosh, kadosh, kadosh, Adonai Tzva’ot" ; English: holy, holy, holy is the Lord of hosts) from the Kedushah. In 1696, a Jewish communal leader named Elias Backoffen was forced to pay for the inscription after being accused of blasphemy. The aleph in the word "Tzva’ot" is backwards, as the letter was removed by the Nazis during the occupation of Czechoslovakia, and later mistakenly placed after the war. The vav in the word "Adonai" has gone missing. In 2009, explanatory plaques were added in English, Czech and Hebrew after the Mayor of Prague was petitioned by a group of North American rabbis.

References

External links

 

Antisemitism in the Czech Republic
Christian sculptures
Monuments and memorials in Prague
Sculptures depicting the Crucifixion of Jesus
Sculptures of men in the Czech Republic
Statues on the Charles Bridge